Shirase Bank is a submarine bank located off the Shirase Coast in the Ross Sea. Name approved 6/88 (ACUF 228).

References

Undersea banks of the Southern Ocean